Calle is a Scandinavian, mostly Swedish, masculine given name, nickname and surname that is a diminutive form of Carl and Karl and an alternate form of Kalle. Calle is also a surname. Notable people referred to by this name include the following:

Given name

Calle Asell (born 1994), Swedish ice hockey player
Calle Brown (born 1992), American football player
Calle Facius (born 1971), Danish football player 
Calle Järnkrok (born 1991), Swedish ice hockey player
Calle Jonsson (born 1983), Swedish criminal suspect
Calle Krantz (born 1997), Swedish ice hockey player
Calle Kristiansson (born 1988), Swedish singer
Calle Lindh (born 1990), Swedish alpine ski racer
Calle Lindström (1868–1955), Swedish singer and comedian
Calle Nilsson (1888–1915), Swedish long-distance athlete
Calle Örnemark (1933–2015), Swedish artist and sculptor
Calle Rosén (born 1994), Swedish ice hockey player
Calle Själin (born 1999), Swedish ice hockey player

Nickname

Calle Aber Abrahamsson, a nickname of Karl Gustaf Emanuel Abrahamsson, who is also known as Carl Abrahamsson (1896–1948), Swedish athlete, bandy and ice hockey player
Calle Halfvarsson, nickname of Carl-Christian Halfvarsson (born 1989), Swedish cross-country skier 
Calle Johansson, nickname of Carl Christian Johansson, (born 1967), Swedish ice hockey player and coach
Calle Jularbo, nickname of Carl Jularbo, (1893–1966), Swedish accordionist
Calle Schlettwein, nickname of Carl-Hermann Gustav Schlettwein (born 1954), Namibian politician
Calle Steen, nickname of Carl Erik Steén (born 1980), Swedish ice hockey player
Calle Wede, nickname of Carl Wede (born 1990), Swedish footballer

Surname

Álvaro Calle (born 1953), Colombian football player
Antonio Calle (born 1978), known as Calle, Spanish football player 
Ed Calle, Venezuelan musician
Elkin Calle (born 1980), Colombian football player
Eugenia Calle (1952–2009), American cancer epidemiologist
Ignacio Calle (1931–1982), Colombian football player
Javier Calle (born 1991), Colombian football player
Johanna Calle (born 1965), Colombian artist
José Calle (1945–2020), French rugby football player
María Elena Calle (born 1975), Ecuadorian marathon runner
María Luisa Calle (born 1968), Colombian cyclist
Paul Calle (1928–2010), American artist
Pierre Calle (1889–?), Belgian fencer
Renán Calle (born 1976), Ecuadorian football 
Sophie Calle (born 1953), French writer, photographer, installation artist, and conceptual artist
William Calle (born 1946), Peruvian army general and politician

Middle name
María Victoria Calle Correa (born 1959), Colombian Magistrate

See also

Cale (name)
Call (surname)
Calla (name)
Carle, surnames
Carle (given name)
Colle (surname)
Kalle, given name

Danish masculine given names
Swedish masculine given names
Spanish-language surnames